Bigg Boss Marathi 3 is the third season of the Marathi version of the reality television show Bigg Boss broadcast in India. The grand premiere was held on 19 September 2021 on Colors Marathi and Voot with Mahesh Manjrekar as the host for the third time. The Grand Finale was held on 26 December 2021 where Vishal Nikam became the winner and Jay Dudhane became the runner-up.

Production

Delay 
The show was expected to launch from May 2020, but due to COVID-19 pandemic in Maharashtra the show was delayed for a year and postponed to 2021.

Eye logo 
The border of the eye is golden with a medium turquoise background. Electric lines come from the background of the eye. A golden pipe-like stem joined the eye border to the big center iris.

Teaser 
On 21 June 2021, the makers had officially launched the season 3 promo on Colors Marathi. Actor-filmmaker Mahesh Manjrekar confirmed his return to host the show.

House 
For the third season of Bigg Boss Marathi, the house has been given maximum Marathi traditional touch. They gave Marathi elements on every wall of the house. Wood is used in the house and green and red colors are used more.

Special episode 
 19 September 2021 (4 hours)
 15 October 2021 (2 hours)

Housemates status

Housemates

Original entrants 
The participants in the order of appearance and entry in house are:
 Sonali Patil - Television actress and model. Known for playing the lead role in Vaiju No.1 and Aarya Deshmukh in Devmanus. She made her debut in Sony Marathi's Julta Julta Jultay Ki. Before starting career as an actress she was a professor in renowned college.
 Vishal Nikam - Television actor and model. Known for playing lead role in Dakkhancha Raja Jotiba and Sata Jalmachya Gathi. Currently, he was seen in Jay Bhawani Jay Shivaji as Shiva Kashid.
 Sneha Wagh - Television actress. She made her debut with Marathi serial Kaata Rute Kunala where she played the role of Chandana. Known for playing the role of Jyoti in Imagine TV's Jyoti. She played the role of Moora in the show Chandragupt Maurya telecasted on SET.
 Utkarsh Shinde - Doctor and singer. He records Ambedkarite songs and Marathi language film songs. He is the son of Marathi singer Anand Shinde and elder brother of Adarsh Shinde.
 Mira Jagannath - Television actress. Known for playing the role of Momo in Yeu Kashi Tashi Me Nandayla and supporting role in Mazhya Navryachi Bayko.
 Trupti Desai - Social activist.
 Avishkar Darwhekar - Film and television actor. mainly acted as supporting character in Tu Majha Saangaati, Hya Gojirwanya Gharat, Adhuri Ek Kahani. He also did many films such as Maan Sanmaan, Mi Tulas Tujhya Angani, Kiran Kulkarni v/s Kiran Kulkarni, etc.
 Surekha Kudachi - Television actress and dancer. Known for negative roles in Swabhiman - Shodh Astitvacha, Devyani... Ekka Raja Rani, Chandra Aahe Sakshila and many more.
 Gayatri Datar - Television actress. Known for playing the lead role in Tula Pahate Re. She was a contestant of Marathi dancing reality show Yuva Dancing Queen and Comedy show Chala Hawa Yeu Dya.
 Vikas Patil - Television actor. Known for playing the lead role in Bayko Ashi Havvi, Lek Mazi Ladaki, Suvasini and Vartul.
 Shivlila Patil - Kirtankar
 Jay Dudhane - Reality television actor and entrepreneur, winner of MTV Splitsvilla X3.
 Meenal Shah - Television actor and model, participated in MTV Roadies (season 15).
 Akshay Waghmare - Film and television actor. Known for playing the lead role in Ti Phulrani.
 Santosh Choudhari - Singer. Mainly sings Koligeets and also known as Dadus.

Wild-Card entrants 
 Adish Vaidya – Television actor. Mainly works in marathi and hindi television. Known for playing the role of Archis Naik in Ratris Khel Chale and Mohit Chavan in Ghum Hai Kisikey Pyaar Meiin. He also played supporting roles in Barrister Babu and Saam Daam Dand Bhed. He also portrayed a negative role as a cheel in Naagin.

 Neetha Shetty - Television actress. Mainly works in Hindi television. She is best known for the TV series Ghar Ki Lakshmi Betiyann as Gauri and in Kahiin To Hoga as Dr. Archita.

Twists 
 Mahesh Manjrekar introduces new secret room i.e. "Temptation Room", where contestants will get a chance to have a phone call or get info about other contestants, but for that they will have to sacrifice something.
 Every week contestants will get a new theme.

Themes

Jodi Ki Bedi

Weekly Summary

Guest appearances

Through direct contact

Through video conferencing

Nominations table

Notes 
  indicates the House Captain.
  indicates the Nominees for house captaincy.
  indicates that the Housemate was directly nominated for eviction prior to the regular nominations process.
  indicates that the housemate has Ejected.
  indicates that the housemate has Re-Entered.
  indicates that the Housemate was granted immunity from nominations.
  indicates the contestant has been evicted.
  indicates that the contestant was just a guest entrant.
  indicates the contestant has been walked out of the show.
  indicates a new wildcard contestant.
  indicates the winner.
  indicates the first runner up.
  indicates the second runner up.
  indicates the third runner up.
  indicates the fourth runner up.

: Housemates had to save one housemate and nominate one housemate of the opposite gender only.
: Housemates were divided into pairs for this week. Each pair had to nominate two pairs.
: Shivlila left the house due to medical treatment but later she revealed that she won't coming back by sending a video as her condition became worse.
: After Surekha was evicted, she was given the power to choose the captain for the next week and hence Trupti became the captain.
: Housemates had to perform a task where they had to get diamonds from a basket and the first one to get the diamond would get to save one other housemate from nomination.
: Sneha, Gayatri, and Vishal were nominated due to their poor behaviour, violence and damaging Bigg Boss property.
: Wildcard contestants were safe from one week's nomination and eviction.
: Utkarsh won immunity after winning the Temptation task and Vishal was already nominated by Utkarsh beforehand after he also won the power to nominate one contestant.
: In order to make their favorite captaincy candidate win, Sneha and Sonali nominated themselves to make Jay and Vishal the captain respectively.
: Utkarsh gained immunity after winning the Temptation task and to claim that immunity power, he had to nominate Mira. He agreed and Mira was nominated for eviction.
: Utkarsh won the main task and was selected to fight for the captaincy position but he voluntarily refused and thus was replaced by Mira.
: Adish, Sneha and Trupti re-entered the house and had to carry out the tasks including nomination where the trio had to nominate several contestants in a mutual decision. They were also the king and queens for that week.
: For the first time in the history of Bigg Boss Marathi, a mid-week eviction was held after which only the Top 5 contestants would reach the finale.

References

External links 
 Bigg Boss Marathi 3 at Voot

2021 Indian television seasons
03
Marathi-language television shows
Colors Marathi original programming